Zolotukha is a rural locality (a settlement) in Ilyinskoye Rural Settlement, Kolchuginsky District, Vladimir Oblast, Russia. The population was 281 as of 2010. There are 18 streets.

Geography 
Zolotukha is located on the Peksha River, 19 km north of Kolchugino (the district's administrative centre) by road. Aleksino is the nearest rural locality.

References 

Rural localities in Kolchuginsky District